T. Sureshkumar is an Indian politician and incumbent Member of the Tamil Nadu Legislative Assembly from the Chengam constituency. He represents the Desiya Murpokku Dravidar Kazhagam party.

References

Living people
Desiya Murpokku Dravida Kazhagam politicians
Year of birth missing (living people)
Place of birth missing (living people)
Tamil Nadu MLAs 2011–2016